Benjamin Manuel Gischard (born 17 November 1995) is a Swiss male artistic gymnast and a member of the national team. He participated at the 2014 World Artistic Gymnastics Championships in Nanjing, China, and qualified for the 2016 Summer Olympics.

References

External links 
 

1995 births
Living people
Swiss male artistic gymnasts
Sportspeople from the canton of Bern
Gymnasts at the 2016 Summer Olympics
Olympic gymnasts of Switzerland
Gymnasts at the 2020 Summer Olympics
21st-century Swiss people